William James "Buddy" Hirsch (January 11, 1909 – October 25, 1997) was an American Hall of Fame trainer of Thoroughbred racehorses. He was born in San Francisco, California, the son of Hall of Fame trainer Max Hirsch.

A trainer from 1932 to 1982, Buddy Hirsch served as a trainer for the King Ranch of Texas for more than 40 years. Although best remembered for his affiliation with King Ranch, in California he trained horses for several other prominent owners from the East Coast such as Harry Isaacs, Alfred Vanderbilt Jr., Joan and John Hay Whitney's Greentree Stable as well as Edward Lasker and his wife, the actress Jane Greer.

Hirsch graduated from Georgetown University and worked during the Great Depression era at a Wall Street brokerage owned by Thoroughbred racing fan and stable owner Bernard Baruch. During World War II, Hirsch served with the United States Army and earned a Bronze Star and a Purple Heart.

In 1977, Hirsch turned over training duties for King Ranch to his son, Bill. In 1982, Hirsch was inducted into the National Museum of Racing and Hall of Fame in 1982. He died at age 88 in 1997 at Bal Harbour, Florida, and was buried next to his parents in the Cemetery of the Holy Rood in Westbury, Long Island, New York.

References

1909 births
1997 deaths
American stockbrokers
American horse trainers
United States Army personnel of World War II
Deaths from dementia in Florida
Deaths from Alzheimer's disease
Burials at the Cemetery of the Holy Rood
Georgetown University alumni
Sportspeople from San Francisco
United States Thoroughbred Racing Hall of Fame inductees
20th-century American businesspeople